Kingsmill or Kingsmills may refer to:

Places
 Kingsmill, Virginia, an area of James City County, Virginia, United States
 Kingsmill, County Armagh, Northern Ireland, site of the 1976 Kingsmill massacre
 Kingsmill, Ontario, Canada
 Kingsmill, Texas, a ghost town in the United States
 Kingsmill Islands or the Gilbert Islands
 Kingsmills Park, a football ground in Inverness, Scotland
 Kingsmill Resort, a resort near Williamsburg, Virginia

Other uses
 Kingsmill (surname), a surname (and list of people with the surname)
 Kingsmill (bread), a British brand of bread made by Associated British Foods
 HMS Kingsmill (K484) and later USS Kingsmill (DE-200), a frigate first commissioned in 1943
 , a British merchant vessel of the Age of Sail
 Kingsmill Championship, a women's professional golf tournament in the US

People with the given name
 Kingsmill Bates (1916–2006), British naval officer